Ryan De Jongh (born 26 November 1989) is a South African soccer player who last played as a defensive midfielder for South African Premier Division side Sekhukhune United. De Jongh was born in Westbury.

References

1989 births
Living people
Soccer players from Johannesburg
South African soccer players
Association football midfielders
F.C. AK players
Maritzburg United F.C. players
Platinum Stars F.C. players
Bloemfontein Celtic F.C. players
Sekhukhune United F.C. players
South African Premier Division players